The Ust-Katav Wagon-Building Plant, officially the Ust-Katavskiy Carriage Works named after S. M. Kirov is a railroad carriage works in Ust-Katav, Chelyabinsk Oblast, Russia.

From 1947 to the end of the 20th century (before the series KTM-8), the factory built trams under the brand name KТМ, which is often used as an informal designation for subsequent models with digital items (e.g. tram 71-619 is also known as KTM-19).

History 
The factory was founded in 1758.

The plant built streetcars (trams) from 1901. The first tram was made for Tbilisi. In 1960, the enterprise created a special design office to design tramway rolling stock, which has developed about 20 models of trams. The factory set a world record for the number of cars produced for one model (14,991 cars of model KTM-5).

Currently, the plant produces low-floor trams of different variations of models 71-623 and 71-631. In 2006 the factory built the first of a low-floor articulated tram car type 71-630 (trialled in Moscow). In 2009 UKVZ released two partially low-floor single-sided single-section cars of type 71-623, which went on trial in Ufa and Nizhny Novgorod. Additional trams of these models were built in 2010 for Moscow, Perm, Nizhnekamsk and Krasnodar. The plant also produces spare parts for trams and manufacturing service maintenance of trams.

In addition to trams, the plant produces gas pressure regulating equipment, pipe fittings, pumps, consumer goods.

In accordance with the Decree of the President of the Russian Federation dated 11 June 2011 number 772 and the Federal Government on July 7, 2011 № 1159-r of the Federal State Unitary Enterprise Ust-Katavsky Car Building Plant Kirov was converted into a branch of Federal State Unitary Enterprise Khrunichev State Research and Production Space Center.

Products 
 H/M (1937-1941), two-axle tram. Production of this model was transferred from Mytishchi machine-building factory (now "Metrovagonmash"), where it was produced since 1927.
 KTM-1/KTP-1 (1947-1961), two-axle tram with all-metal monocoque body.
 KTM-2/KTP-2 (1958-1969), two-axle tram with a metal body.
 KTM-5 (71-605; 1969–1992), four-axle tram with single-leaf sliding doors. Nearly 15,000 cars of this type were built, which allowed them to become the most widely produced  tramcar in the world. They have been used in many tram systems in Russia are the only type of rolling stock in some of them.
 71-608 (KTM-8; 1988–2007), four-axle tram. The tram KTM-8 is used in many Russian cities, as well as the CIS. In Moscow, it still remains one of the most common types of rolling stock.
 71-611 (KTM-11, 1992–1995) - Russian passenger double sided (doors on both sides, designed for traction in the backs of cars multiple-unit train control) tram car with the body of the 71-608 is designed for use on light-rail lines.
 71-619 (KTM-19; 1999–2012), four-axle tram. Used in many Russian cities, as well as in the countries of the CIS.
 71-623 (71-623; from 2009), four-axle tram with a variable level of the floor.
 71-630
 71-631 (from 2011), six-axle articulated three-section tram. At the moment, six cars have been built; they are operated in St. Petersburg.
 71-633
 71-628 (from 2021), four-axle fully low floor tram.

Gallery

References

External links 

 Omnibus magazine. Ust-Katavsky Carriage Works: Pages of History
 magazine "Private Equity." Streetcar Named Desire
 Ust-Katav. How do trams. Report from the Ust-Katav Railcar

Rail vehicle manufacturers of Russia
Tram manufacturers
Companies established in 1758
Russian brands
Federal State Unitary Enterprises of Russia
Khrunichev Center
Companies based in Chelyabinsk Oblast
Electric vehicle manufacturers of Russia
Manufacturing companies established in 1758